Gloria is a 2014 Mexican drama film directed by Christian Keller, based on the life of Mexican pop singer Gloria Trevi. It was one of fourteen films shortlisted by Mexico to be their submission for the Academy Award for Best Foreign Language Film at the 88th Academy Awards, but it lost out to 600 Miles.

Plot
The film chronicles the life of one of Latin America's biggest pop icons, Gloria Trevi. The film opens with Gloria at an audition for the popular music composer, Sergio Andrade. She impresses Andrade and earns a spot as a member of the Mexican pop group Boquitas Pintadas. The group fails to achieve much fame, but Sergio notices Gloria's potential as a solo artist, and grooms her as such from then on. Gloria quickly becomes a huge success all over Latin America, but her career comes to a screeching halt when she is found in the middle of a controversial sex scandal.

Cast
 Sofía Espinosa as Gloria Trevi
 Marco Pérez as 
Tatiana del Real as María Raquenel
Ximena Romo as Aline Hernández
Osvaldo Ríos as El Tigre
 Ricardo Kleinbaum as Abogado
 Moises Arizmendi as Fernando Esquina
 Magali Boysselle as Mónica Ga
 Estefanía Villarreal as Laura
 Paula Serrano as Reportera Española

Awards and nominations

Ariel Awards
The Ariel Awards are awarded annually by the Mexican Academy of Film Arts and Sciences in Mexico. Gloria won five awards out of 14 nominations.

|-
|rowspan="14" scope="row"| 2016
|scope="row"| Gloria
|scope="row"| Best Picture
| 
|-
|scope="row"| Christian Keller
|rowspan="1" scope="row"| Best First Feature Film
| 
|-
|scope="row"| Sofía Espinosa
|scope="row"| Best Actress
| 
|-
|scope="row"| Marco Pérez
|scope="row"| Best Actor
| 
|-
|scope="row"| Tatiana del Real
|rowspan="1" scope="row"| Breakthrough Female Performance
| 
|-
|scope="row"| Sabina Berman
|rowspan="1" scope="row"| Best Original Screenplay
| 
|-
|scope="row"| Julieta Álvarez
|rowspan="1" scope="row"| Best Art Direction
| 
|-
|scope="row"| Adriana Martínez, Patricia Rommel
|rowspan="1" scope="row"| Best Film Editing
| 
|-
|scope="row"| Raúl Prado, Edgar Piña, Juan Carlos Lepe
|rowspan="1" scope="row"| Best Visual Effects
| 
|-
|scope="row"| Martín Boege
|rowspan="1" scope="row"| Best Cinematography
| 
|-
|scope="row"| Lorne Balfe
|scope="row"| Best Original Music
| 
|-
|scope="row"| Matías Barberis, Jaime Baksht, Michelle Couttolenc
|rowspan="1" scope="row"| Best Sound
| 
|-
|scope="row"| David Gameros
|rowspan="1" scope="row"| Best Make-Up
| 
|-
|scope="row"| Gilda Navarro
|rowspan="1" scope="row"| Best Costume Design
| 
|-

References

External links
 

2014 films
2014 biographical drama films
Films scored by Lorne Balfe
Mexican biographical drama films
2010s Spanish-language films
2014 drama films
2010s Mexican films